Damon Paul Huard (born July 9, 1973) is a former American football quarterback. He is the director of community relations and fundraising for the University of Washington football program, his alma mater.

Huard was signed by the Cincinnati Bengals as an undrafted free agent in 1996, and played twelve seasons in the National Football League (NFL) with the Miami Dolphins, New England Patriots, and Kansas City Chiefs. While with the Patriots, he won two Super Bowl rings.

Early years
Born in Yakima, Washington, Huard was raised southeast of Tacoma in Puyallup, where his father Mike was a high school teacher and head football  He was the first to hold a snap for kicker Ryan Longwell when they played for Aylen Junior High.

Huard attended Puyallup High School, where he was a letterman for the Vikings in football and basketball. He played tight end as a sophomore, as the quarterback was senior Billy Joe Hobert. As a senior in 1990, Huard was named the Powerade State Player of the Year and won All-America honors.

College career
After graduation from high school, Huard attended the University of Washington in Seattle, where he redshirted in 1991, the Huskies' national championship season. Wearing jersey number 7, he started for the first time in 1993 under first-year head coach Jim Lambright, and continued as a starter through 1995. That season, he passed for 2,415 yards and 11 touchdowns; he finished his career as the Huskies' all-time passing leader with 5,692 yards.

As a junior in 1994, Huard led the Dawgs to an 18-point victory over the Miami Hurricanes at the Orange Bowl, halting their nine-year home winning streak at 58 games.

Professional career

Cincinnati Bengals
After going undrafted in the 1996 NFL Draft, Huard was signed by the Cincinnati Bengals as an undrafted free agent, but was waived on August 19.

Miami Dolphins
After spending the 1996 season out of football, Huard signed with the Miami Dolphins on April 24, 1997. He was released during final cuts on August 24, but was re-signed to the team's practice squad two days later. He was promoted to the active roster on September 6 and spent the remainder of the season as the Dolphins' third quarterback. Following the season, Huard played in NFL Europe for the Frankfurt Galaxy. In 1998, Huard saw action in two games for the Dolphins as a reserve, while acting as the team's third quarterback in eight games. He finished the season six-of-nine for 85 yards and an interception.

Huard began the 1999 season as the Dolphins' holder on the field goal unit, but following an injury to starter Dan Marino, in the future Hall of Famer's final season, Huard started his first NFL game on October 24 after replacing Marino on October 17. He won his first three games that he started, tying a Dolphins record set by Earl Morrall in 1972. Huard posted a  record before Marino returned in November, finishing the regular season with eight touchdowns, four interceptions, and 1,288 passing yards. Huard also saw time in the playoffs, replacing Marino for the second half of a  loss to the Jacksonville Jaguars. Several weeks earlier on December 3, he signed a two-year contract extension with the Dolphins.

Despite Huard's performance in 1999, Jay Fiedler was signed to be the Dolphins' starter in 2000. Huard started one game in Fiedler's place, a  win over the Colts on November 26.  On that day, Damon and his brother Brock became the NFL's first set of brothers to start at QB on the same weekend in league history. Damon made his only start that year against the Colts, while Brock started against the Denver Broncos for the Seahawks.

New England Patriots
A free agent after the 2000 season, Huard signed with the New England Patriots. At training camp, he competed with second-year Tom Brady and third-year Michael Bishop for the backup job behind long-time starter Drew Bledsoe; In 2001 Brady became the team's second quarterback and Huard the third for the start of the season. When Bledsoe was injured in Week 2, Brady became the Patriots' starter for the remainder of the season, while Huard was the backup until Bledsoe returned in Week 10. As the third quarterback, Huard won his first Super Bowl ring in February 2002 when the Patriots beat the St. Louis Rams.

Huard appeared in his first game as a Patriot in 2002, leading a touchdown drive in a blowout win over the New York Jets on September 15. Later in the season, he entered a game in a punt formation and ran a successful quarterback sneak for a first down.

While a backup for the Patriots in 2003, Huard saw time in two more games while also seeing time on the team's scout team during practice. Before the AFC Championship game against the Indianapolis Colts, he mimicked the line calls and audibles of Colts quarterback Peyton Manning for the Patriots' defense during practice.

Kansas City Chiefs

After 2003, Huard signed with the Kansas City Chiefs as a free agent. As the team's third quarterback, he did not see any action for his first two seasons (2004 and 2005). In the 2006 opener, starter Trent Green suffered a concussion and was replaced by Huard. He started the next seven games, posting a  record until suffering a groin injury. Green returned and started the remainder of the season and the team's playoff game against the Indianapolis Colts.

After the season, the Chiefs signed Huard to a three-year contract extension, and Green was traded to the Miami Dolphins. During the 2006 season, Huard set the NFL record for lowest percentage passes intercepted in a season among qualified players, with only one of his 244 attempts being intercepted.

In the Chiefs' 2007 training camp, Huard competed with second-year Brodie Croyle, the team's third-round  draft choice in 2006. Huard was named the starter on August 25, and started the first nine games of the season, going  In his final start, Huard suffered a back injury and was replaced by Croyle, but Croyle himself was injured after his second start, both losses, and Huard returned as the starter in Week 13. He suffered a hand injury in the game and Croyle started the Chiefs' next two games. In Week 16, Croyle was injured again and Huard saw time in a reserve before Croyle returned to start the last game of the season. The Chiefs ended the season on a nine-game losing streak.

Croyle started the opener in 2008, but again suffered an injury and was replaced by Huard. In Week 2, Huard started but suffered a concussion and was replaced by Tyler Thigpen, a seventh-round draft pick in 2007. Thigpen started the Chiefs' Week 3 game before Huard returned for Weeks 4 and 5. Croyle returned after the bye week in Week 7 to start, was injured again, and replaced by Huard, who suffered a thumb injury. He was placed on injured reserve the next week, ending his season. The same week, Croyle was also placed on injured reserve, leaving Thigpen as the Chiefs' starter for the remainder of the season.

Following the season, Scott Pioli, the Patriots' director of player personnel during Huard's tenure in New England, was hired to be the Chiefs' general manager. Huard was released by the Chiefs on February 24, roughly a week before Pioli traded for Matt Cassel, a Patriots backup who replaced an injured Brady in 2008, to be the Chiefs' starter in 2009.

San Francisco 49ers
Huard signed with the San Francisco 49ers on March 4, 2009, and competed for a job behind Alex Smith with Shaun Hill and 2009 fifth-round pick Nate Davis, he was released on September 1, and retired.

After football
The University of Washington announced in June 2013 that former Husky quarterback Damon Huard had taken a new role as Chief Administrative Officer of the football program. Huard had been a fundraiser for the previous three seasons in the athletic department. Under new head coach Chris Petersen, Huard became director of external relations.

Since 2010, he has been the analyst on Husky radio broadcasts, alongside Bob Rondeau. Huard and former teammate Dan Marino have a winemaking venture in Woodinville called

Personal life
Huard and his wife Julie Ann have three children.

His younger brothers were also quarterbacks at Puyallup: Brock also started at Washington and in the NFL, and Luke played at 

His son, Sam Huard, plays quarterback at Cal Poly-San Luis Obispo after starting his college football career at Washington. Sam started his first game in the 2021 Apple Cup.

See also

 Washington Huskies football statistical leaders

References

External links

University of Washington Athletics – Damon Huard

1973 births
Living people
Sportspeople from Yakima, Washington
Players of American football from Washington (state)
American football quarterbacks
Washington Huskies football players
Cincinnati Bengals players
Frankfurt Galaxy players
Miami Dolphins players
New England Patriots players
Kansas City Chiefs players
San Francisco 49ers players
Washington Huskies football announcers
Sportspeople from Puyallup, Washington
Ed Block Courage Award recipients